Harrington is a township municipality in the Laurentides region of Quebec, Canada, part of the Argenteuil Regional County Municipality.

Its population centres include Harrington, Lac-Keatley, Lakeview, Lost River, and Rivington.

Geography
Harrington is a land of lakes and rivers, stocked with abundant fish. The Rouge River is the main river flowing through it, and the largest lakes include Lake (Lac) MacDonald, Green Lake, and Lake Harrington, each attracting a large number summer cottage vacationers.

The Lost River flows for some miles from a spring that disappears under a calcareous rock between Gate Lake and Fraser Lake.

History
Harrington Township first appeared on the Gale and Duberger Map of 1795, but was not settled until 1830 when Scottish pioneers settled in the Lost River area in the east. In 1841, the township is officially established and in 1855, the township municipality was formed.

It is believed that the name Harrington may be attributed to a location in England, however, the local post office was identified under the name of Rivington between 1878 and 1961.

Demographics 

Local government

Harrington forms part of the federal electoral district of Argenteuil—La Petite-Nation and has been represented by Stéphane Lauzon of the Liberal Party since 2015. Provincially, Harrington is part of the Argenteuil electoral district and is represented by Agnès Grondin of the Coalition Avenir Québec since 2018.

List of former mayors:

 Ellen Lakoff (2001–2009)
 Keith Robson (2009–2012)
 Jacques Parent (2012–2021)
 Pierre Richard (2021–present)

Education

The Commission scolaire de la Rivière-du-Nord operates French-language public schools.
 École polyvalente Lavigne in Lachute

Sir Wilfrid Laurier School Board operates English-language schools:
 Arundel Elementary School in Arundel serves a portion
 Laurentian Elementary School in Lachute serves a portion
 Grenville Elementary School in Grenville serves a portion
 Laurentian Regional High School in Lachute

See also
List of township municipalities in Quebec

References

External links

Township municipalities in Quebec
Incorporated places in Laurentides
1830 establishments in Lower Canada